The Draw-a-Person test (DAP, DAP test, or Goodenough–Harris Draw-a-Person test) is a psychological projective personality or cognitive test in which the test subject uses simple art supplies to produce depictions of people. It is used to evaluate children and adolescents for a variety of purposes.

History
Developed originally by Florence Goodenough in 1926, this test was first known as the Goodenough Draw-a-Man test. It is detailed in her book titled Measurement of Intelligence by Drawings.  Dale B. Harris later revised and extended the test and it is now known as the Goodenough–Harris Drawing Test. The revision and extension is detailed in his book Children's Drawings as Measures of Intellectual Maturity (1963).

Psychologist Julian Jaynes, in his 1976 book The Origin of Consciousness in the Breakdown of the Bicameral Mind, wrote that the test is "routinely administered as an indicator of schizophrenia," and that while not all schizophrenic patients have trouble drawing a person, when they do, it is very clear evidence of a disorder. Specific signs could include a patient's neglect to include "obvious anatomical parts like hands and eyes," with "blurred and unconnected lines," ambiguous sex and general distortion.  There has been no validation of this test as indicative of schizophrenia. Chapman and Chapman (1968), in a classic study of illusory correlation, showed that the scoring manual, e.g., large eyes as indicative of paranoia, could be generated from the naive beliefs of undergraduates. Likewise, Harris found no validity in personality testing through human figure drawing. He rejected the use of "an elaborate theory of symbolism" to interpret the stylization of features, instead preferring to let the child lead with a simple "Tell me about it" after the drawing.

Administration
Test administration involves the administrator requesting children to complete three individual drawings on separate pieces of paper. Children are asked to draw a man, a woman, and themselves. No further instructions are given and the child is free to make the drawing in whichever way he/she would like. There is no right or wrong type of drawing, although the child must make a drawing of a whole person each time—i.e. head to feet, not just the face. The test has no time limit; however, children rarely take longer than about 10 or 15 minutes to complete all three drawings. Harris's book (1963) provides scoring scales which are used to examine and score the child's drawings. The test is completely non-invasive and non-threatening to children, which is part of its appeal.

The purpose of the test is to assist professionals in inferring children's cognitive developmental levels with little or no influence of other factors such as language barriers or special needs. Any other uses of the test are merely projective and are not endorsed by the first creator.

Evaluation
To evaluate intelligence, the test administrator uses the Draw-a-Person: QSS (quantitative scoring system). This system analyzes fourteen different aspects of the drawings (such as specific body parts and clothing) for various criteria, including presence or absence, detail, and proportion. Goodenough's original scale had 46 scoring items for each drawing, with 5 bonus items for drawings in profile. Harris's scale had 73 items for male figures and 71 for female figures. More recent versions use 64 scoring items for each drawing. A separate standard score is recorded for each drawing, and a total score for all three. The use of a nonverbal, nonthreatening task to evaluate intelligence is intended to eliminate possible sources of bias by reducing variables like primary language, verbal skills, communication disabilities, and sensitivity to working under pressure. However, test results can be influenced by previous drawing experience, a factor that may account for the tendency of middle-class children to score higher on this test than lower-class children, who often have fewer opportunities to draw.

To assess the test-taker for emotional problems, the administrator uses the Draw-a-Person: SPED (Screening Procedure for Emotional Disturbance) to score the drawings. This system is composed of two types of criteria. For the first type, eight dimensions of each drawing are evaluated against norms for the child's age group. For the second type, 47 different items are considered for each drawing.

Validity as a measure of intelligence 
The Draw-a-Person test is commonly used as a measure of intelligence in children, but this has been criticized. Harlene Hayne et al. compared scores on the Draw-A-Person Intellectual Ability Test to scores on the Wechsler Preschool and Primary Scale of Intelligence in 100 children and found a very low correlation (r=0.27). Similarly, results found with child and youth psychiatric inpatients failed to support the hypothesized relationship between human figure drawings and IQ. This suggests that the Draw-a-Person test should not be used as a substitute for other well-established intelligence tests.

Notes

Further reading
 
 Goodenough, F. (1926). Measurement of intelligence by drawings. New York: World Book Co.
 Harris, D. B. (1963). Children's drawings as measures of intellectual maturity. New York: Harcourt, Brace & World, Inc.

External links
 DAP:IQ Draw-A-Person Intellectual Ability Test
 Draw A Person Screening Procedure for Emotional Disturbance (Draw A Person: SPED)

Cognitive tests
Projective tests